From 1944 until 1957, Billboard magazine published a chart that ranked the most-played country music songs in jukeboxes in the United States, based on a survey of over 3000 operators "in all sections of the country"; until 1948 it was the magazine's only country music chart. In 1947, nine songs topped the chart, which was published under the title Most Played Juke Box Folk Records with the exception of the issues of Billboard dated September 6 through November 1, when it was titled Most Played Juke Box Hillbilly Records.  The Juke Box Folk chart is considered the start of the lineage of the magazine's current country music songs charts.

The number-one position was dominated in 1947 by three artists who each topped the chart for at least 14 weeks.  At the start of the year, Merle Travis was at number one with "Divorce Me C.O.D." which had spent 11 weeks in the top spot in 1945, and spent three further non-consecutive weeks atop the chart in 1947, interrupted for a single week by Ernest Tubb's "Rainbow at Midnight".  Tubb's replaced "Divorce Me C.O.D." at number one again in the issue of Billboard dated February 1, but the following week Travis returned to number one with a different single, "So Round, So Firm, So Fully Packed".  This song spent fourteen consecutive weeks at number one, giving him a total of seventeen weeks atop the chart in 1947, the most by any artist.  Two weeks after Travis relinquished the number-one position, Eddy Arnold achieved the first chart-topper of his career with "What Is Life Without Love".  He had two more number ones before the end of the year, making him the only artist with three chart-toppers in 1947.  He ended the year atop the listing with "I'll Hold You in My Heart (Till I Can Hold You in My Arms)".  Arnold would dominate the Juke Box Folk chart the following year, spending almost all of 1948 at number one, and remain popular into the 1950s before his career went into a decline.  He revived his fortunes in the mid-1960s, however, by embracing the "Nashville sound", a newer style of country music which eschewed elements of the earlier honky-tonk style in favor of smooth productions which had a broader appeal, and ended his career with a record total of 28 number-one country singles.

The longest unbroken run at number one in 1947 was the fifteen consecutive weeks achieved by Tex Williams with "Smoke! Smoke! Smoke! (That Cigarette)", which was atop the chart from July until October.  This was the first chart-topper for Williams in his own right, although he had been the uncredited vocalist on Western swing bandleader Spade Cooley's 1945 number one "Shame on You".  Following the success of that record, Cooley and Williams had fallen out, leading to Williams leaving Cooley's band and taking most of the musicians with him to form the new group Western Caravan, which backed him on "Smoke! Smoke! Smoke!"  Despite the success of the single, which was the first million-selling record released on the Capitol label, it would prove to be the only number one for Williams.  Of the six singers who topped the Juke Box Folk chart in 1947, all except for Williams have been elected to the Country Music Hall of Fame.

Chart history

See also
1947 in music
1947 in country music
List of artists who reached number one on the U.S. country chart

References

1947
Country
1947 record charts